Eucaterva variaria is a species of geometrid moth in the family Geometridae. It is found in Central America and North America. It feeds on desert willow (Chilopsis).

The MONA or Hodges number for Eucaterva variaria is 6918.

References

Further reading

 

Ourapterygini
Articles created by Qbugbot
Moths described in 1882